The One World Tour was the tenth tour by Puerto Rican recording artist Ricky Martin, in support of his tenth studio album A Quien Quiera Escuchar (2015). The tour began in Auckland, New Zealand at the Vector Arena on April 17, 2015 and was extended to conclude in the Dubai International Jazz Festival in February 2018. The One World Tour grossed $57.4 million with a total attendance of 802,931 from 105 shows reported in 2015 and 2016.

Setlist
The following setlist was obtained from the October 25, 2016 concert, held at the Movistar Arena in Santiago, Chile. It does not represent all concerts during the duration of the tour.

"Mr. Put It Down"
"This is Good"
"Drop It on Me"
"Shake Your Bon-Bon"
"Adrenalina" 
"Tal Vez"
"Livin' la Vida Loca"
"It's Alright"
"She Bangs"
"Come with Me"
"Asignatura Pendiente"
"Disparo al Corazón"
"Tu Recuerdo"
"Vuelve"
"Adiós"
"Lola, Lola"
"María"
"Vente Pa' Ca"
"La Bomba"
"Por Arriba, Por Abajo"
"Pégate"
"The Cup of Life"
"La Mordidita"

Shows

Notes 

Pollstar Complied Ticket Data

External links
Ricky Martin Official Website

References

Ricky Martin concert tours
2014 concert tours
2015 concert tours
2016 concert tours